Ruth Comfort Mitchell Young (July 21, 1882 – February 18, 1954) was an American writer and playwright who wrote under her maiden name Ruth Comfort Mitchell, as well as her married name, Mrs. Sanborn Young. She was the wife of California State Senator Sanborn Young.

Family

Mitchell was born in San Francisco, California, July 21, 1882. She spent summers in the town of Los Gatos, where her parents and grandparents had summer homes. At age 14, her first poem was published in the Los Gatos Mail, thus launching her literary career, which continued throughout her lifetime.

In 1914, literary friends in San Francisco introduced her to Sanborn Young, who had recently sold his grain business and was traveling. The couple were married in October 1914 in the Grand Canyon and moved to New York City, where Ruth continued her literary pursuits, and he studied photography.

One of her plays, The Sweetmeat Game (1916) was set in San Francisco's Chinatown and inspired her to design her house, known as the Yung See San Fong House, in a Chinese style.

Ruth Comfort Mitchell Young wrote novels, poems, short stories, and plays. Because of her fame, many of the literati visited her house. The Youngs were known to be friendly with President Herbert Hoover, Robert W. Service, Gertrude Atherton, Gertrude Stein, and Fremont Older. Others who were known to visit the house included actresses Joan and Constance Bennett, Senator James D. Phelan, and Governor William D. Stephens. Ruth was very involved with the annual Los Gatos Pageant, the Los Gatos Christian Church, the Daughters of the American Revolution, and the Los Gatos History Club.

Both the Youngs were involved in Republican politics. Ruth served as Republican National Committeewoman from California for eight years and as national and state president of Pro-America, an organization of Republican women founded in 1933. Meanwhile, Sanborn served as a California State Senator for thirteen years.

In February 1954, Ruth was found dead in the bathtub. Sanborn died 10 years later.

Bibliography
The Night Court and Other Verse (1916)
Play the Game! (1921)
Jane Journeys On (1922)
Corduroy (1923)
Narratives in Verse (1923)
The Wishing Carpet (1926)
Water (1931)
The Legend of Susan Dane (1933)
Old San Francisco Fire! (The Fifties) (1933)
Strait Gate (1935)
His wife could eat no lean (Contemporary California short stories) (1937)
Of Human Kindness (1940)
Dust of Mexico (1941)

References

External links
 
 
 
 Short radio episode "Ed's Daughter" from Of Human Kindness, California Legacy Project.

1882 births
1954 deaths
20th-century American novelists
American women novelists
American women poets
American women short story writers
Writers from the San Francisco Bay Area
20th-century American poets
American women dramatists and playwrights
20th-century American women writers
20th-century American dramatists and playwrights
20th-century American short story writers
American women screenwriters
20th-century American screenwriters